Maj Jacobsson (25 November 1909 – 31 January 1996) was a Swedish athlete who won the 80 m hurdles event at the 1930 Women's World Games. Domestically she won eight titles in 1929–1930, in the 80 m, 80 m hurdles, 200 m, long jump and standing long jump.

She was married to Eivar Widlund, an association football goalkeeper.

References

1909 births
1996 deaths
Swedish female sprinters
Swedish female long jumpers
Swedish female hurdlers
Athletes from Stockholm
20th-century Swedish women